The Continental Drifters were an American rock band, formed in Los Angeles, California in 1991 and dissolved in New Orleans, Louisiana about a decade later. Though the line-up changed several times, at one point the band comprised a kind of college rock/indie-rock/power pop supergroup, including as it did Peter Holsapple of The dB's, Mark Walton of The Dream Syndicate, Bangle Vicki Peterson and Susan Cowsill of The Cowsills.

History
The band was formed in Los Angeles in 1991, initially consisting of Carlo Nuccio (drums, vocals), Ray Ganucheau (guitars, banjo, vocals), Mark Walton (bass), Gary Eaton (guitars, vocals) and Danny McGough (keyboards).  The group gigged regularly at Raji's in LA, and were often joined by Susan Cowsill and Vicki Peterson on backing vocals and guitars, and Peter Holsapple (keyboards, guitars), though these three players were not yet official members.

Holsapple was asked to join the band, but initially declined, offering instead to produce the group's debut album.  The resulting disc was not released at the time; after it was completed, Holsapple, Cowsill and Peterson all joined the band officially, while McGough dropped out.

Led by New Orleans natives Nuccio and Ganucheau, most of the band moved to New Orleans over a span of several months during 1993/94.  Eaton was the only member who didn't make the move, and who consequently left the band.  However, shortly after the move Ganucheau developed health problems, and was forced to drop out, being replaced by Robert Maché.  This line up (Nuccio/Walton/Cowsill/Peterson/Holsapple/Maché) recorded the band's first issued album, Continental Drifters, in 1994.

Nuccio left the band after the tour for the first album.  He was replaced by new drummer Russ Broussard, and this line up issued two albums:  Vermilion (1998) and Better Day (2001).

Susan Cowsill and Russ Broussard left the group in early 2002.  The remaining players drafted drummer John Maloney and the returning Ray Ganucheau to continue for several gigs, but at this point the group essentially wound down as a continuing concern.

In 2003, the band's unissued debut album was finally released, and a Continental Drifters line-up of Gary Eaton, Ray Ganucheau, Carlo Nuccio, Peter Holsapple, and Mark Walton played a gig to celebrate.

On April 28, 2009, the group reunited for the fifth annual Threadhead Patry in New Orleans, LA during Jazz Fest daze between, followed by a show on May 1 at Carrollton Station, playing to a sold-out crowd.

In 2015, Omnivore Recordings issued a double album retrospective focused on unreleased and live tracks from the band's long history. In September 2015, the band, including all members from both the Los Angeles era and the later New Orleans manifestations, came together for fundraising concerts in New Orleans and Los Angeles.

Discography
Singles
"The Mississippi" b/w "Johnny Oops" (7"/45rpm, 1992, SOL)
"Christopher Columbus Transcontinental Highway" b/w "Meet On The Ledge" (7"/45rpm, 1997, Black Dog)

10"
Listen, Listen (CDEP/10", 2001, Blue Rose)

LPs 
Continental Drifters (1994, Monkey Hill/2001, Razor & Tie)
Vermilion (CD, 1998, Blue Rose/1999, Razor & Tie)
Better Day (CD, 2001, Razor & Tie/Blue Rose)
Nineteen Ninety-Three (CD, recorded 1993/released 2003, Blue Rose)

Compilations and appearances
"When You Dance, I Can Really Love" (CD, 1995, This Note's for You, Too: A Tribute to Neil Young, Inbetweens)
"I Can't Let Go" (CD, 1995, Sing Hollies in Reverse, Eggbert)
Drifted: In The Beginning & Beyond (CD, released 2015, Omnivore Recordings)

Band members

 Mark Walton - Bass, Acoustic Guitar, Vocals
 Carlo Nuccio - Drums, Guitar, Vocals
 Gary Eaton - Guitar, Vocals
 Ray Ganucheau - Guitar, Banjo, Vocals
 Dan McGough - Organ, Piano
 Peter Holsapple - Guitar, Keyboards, Accordion, Mandolin, Vocals
 Susan Cowsill - Acoustic Guitar, Vocals
 Vicki Peterson - Guitars, Vocals
 Robert Maché  - Guitars, Mandolin, Vocals
 Russ Broussard - Drums

References

External links
Official site

Rock music groups from California
Rock music groups from Louisiana
Musical groups established in 1991
1991 establishments in California